Cañete Province is located in southern Lima Region, Peru. It is bordered by the Lima Province on the north, the Ica Region on the south, the Huarochirí Province and Yauyos Province on the east, and the Pacific Ocean on the west. Its capital is the town of San Vicente de Cañete District. San Luis is the Capital of the Afro-Peruvian Folklore. Is the most populated province in Lima Region and the third most important province in Lima (After Lima and Huaura).

Climate
The weather of the province's coastal area has two well-defined seasons:
 The sunny season, with temperatures of around 30 °C (86.4 °F), during daytime.
 The "sunless" season (May–December), during which the sun is covered by clouds. The extreme humidity causes a sensation of cold during this season, even if the temperature never gets lower than 11 °C (51.8 °F).

Political division
The province is divided into sixteen districts (singular: distrito):

 San Vicente de Cañete (seat)
 Asia
 Calango
 Cerro Azul
 Chilca
 Coayllo
 Imperial
 Lunahuaná
 Mala
 Nuevo Imperial
 Pacarán
 Quilmaná
 San Antonio
 San Luis
 Santa Cruz de Flores
 Zúñiga

Attractions

The coast of Cañete, with beaches such as Asia, Chilca, Puerto Viejo, León Dormido, Costa del Campo,  Totoritas, Chocaya, Chepeconde, Puerto Fiel, Gallardo and Cerro Azul, is one of the province's main touristic attractions. The pleasant valley of Lunahuaná, a paradise for adventure sports lovers, is just half an hour from San Vicente de Cañete. The main attraction is the fast running Cañete River, which features rapids up to Class IV. Each year, the valley hosts a festival involving rafting, trekking, gliding, mountain biking and fishing competitions. There are a few annual festivals in Cañete. The most important ones are Festival of Black Art in late August and Adventure Sports Festival in Lunahuaná, held in February.

See also 
 Afro-Peruvian
 Inka Wasi
 Musica Negra
Nueva LIMA
Huaura Province
Susana Baca
Teodoro Fernández Meyzan
Javier Alvarado
Manuel Donayre
Paloma (archaeological site): remains of an ancient settlement in Chilca District

External links 
  Official website of the Cañete province

Provinces of the Lima Region